Cesarò is a comune (municipality) in the Metropolitan City of Messina in the Italian region Sicily, located about  east of Palermo and about  southwest of Messina.

It is included in the Parco dei Nebrodi.

References 

Cities and towns in Sicily